Robert Ferguson (2 October 1884 – 1962) was a Scottish footballer who played for Liverpool during the early part of the 20th century.

Life and playing career
Born in Cleland, North Lanarkshire, Ferguson played for Third Lanark for six years before he was signed by manager Tom Watson for Liverpool in 1912. Ferguson made his debut on 4 September 1912 in a First Division match at Anfield against Oldham, a game that saw the Reds win 2–0, He scored his first goal the following month on 19 October in a 4–1 home league win over Blackburn. Robert was an ever present for the rest of the season, the only player in the Liverpool ranks to do so.

Ferguson was a reliable, hard-working defender during the period leading up to World War I of 1914–18, but during the 1914–15 campaign he lost his place to Donald McKinlay and never really gained it back, Ferguson's Anfield contract ended in 1915 after he had made 103 appearances, scoring two goals.

Career details
 Liverpool F.C (1912–1915) 103 appearances, 2 goals
 1913–14 FA Cup Runners-up medal

References

Scottish footballers
Liverpool F.C. players
Third Lanark A.C. players
People from Cleland, North Lanarkshire
1884 births
1962 deaths
Date of death missing
English Football League players
Scottish Football League players
Association football wing halves
Footballers from North Lanarkshire
Scottish emigrants to the United States
FA Cup Final players